Owmal-e Estad Ahmad (also Romanized as Owmāl-e Estād Aḩmad; also known as Owmāl) is a village in Khvosh Rud Rural District, Bandpey-ye Gharbi District, Babol County, Mazandaran Province, Iran. At the 2006 census, its population was 41, in 11 families.

References 

Populated places in Babol County